Laurie Murphy (10 September 1899 – 20 July 1980) was an Australian rules footballer who played with Collingwood and North Melbourne in the Victorian Football League (VFL).

Recruited out of the Diamond Valley, Murphy was both a defender and follower. Murphy appeared in Collingwood's losing 1922 VFL Grand Final and 1925 VFL Grand Final sides. He represented Victoria three times. Murphy was coach of the Warrnambool Football Club in 1930.

References

1899 births
Australian rules footballers from Victoria (Australia)
Collingwood Football Club players
North Melbourne Football Club players
Warrnambool Football Club players
Warrnambool Football Club coaches
1980 deaths